Caladenia cruciformis, commonly known as the crucifix spider orchid, or red cross spider orchid, is a plant in the orchid family Orchidaceae and is endemic to a small area in Victoria. It is a rare ground orchid with a single, sparsely hairy leaf and a single dark red to crimson flower with blackish tips.

Description
Caladenia cruciformis is a terrestrial, perennial, deciduous, herb with a marble-sized, underground tuber.

The flowers have a fragrance resembling a hot motor. The petals are shorter than the sepals and lack the blackish tips. It is dark red with a whitish base and the sides of the labellum turn upwards. There are four to six rows of linear foot-shaped calli along the centre of the labellum, decreasing in size towards the front. Flowering occurs between September and October and is followed by a capsule which releases thousands of black seeds a few weeks later.

Taxonomy and naming
Caladenia cruciformis was first formally described by David L. Jones in 1999 from a specimen collected near Stuart Mill and the description was published in The Orchadian. The specific epithet (cruciformis) is derived from the Latin word crux meaning "cross" and the suffix -formis meaning "shaped".

Distribution and habitat
The red cross spider orchid is found in eucalypt forest or woodland with a heathy understorey, growing in sandy loam with accumulated leaf litter. It is only known from a small area near Stuart Mill and the Dalyenong Nature Conservation Reserve.

Conservation
Caladenia cruciformis is listed as "Endangered" under the Victorian Government Flora and Fauna Guarantee Act 1988. A successful program of propagation and reintroduction of the species has been undertaken and a second generation of reintroduced plants have set seed in four separate sites. The main threats to the species include unauthorised firewood collection, grazing by native and introduced animals, weed invasion, inappropriate burning and illegal collection.

References

cruciformis
Plants described in 1999
Endemic orchids of Australia
Orchids of Victoria (Australia)
Taxa named by David L. Jones (botanist)